Sybaguasu subcarinatus is a species of beetle in the family Cerambycidae. It was described by Henry Walter Bates in 1885. It is known from Panama.

References

Beetles described in 1885
Hemilophini